Glory Defined is a song written and recorded by Christian rock band Building 429 It was released as a single by from their 2004 album Space in Between Us and included on WOW Hits 2005.

Tracklisting

Charts
Weekly

Decade-end

References

2004 singles
Building 429 songs
2004 songs
Word Records singles